Diepreye Solomon Peter Alamieyeseigha (DSP) (16 November 1952 – 10 October 2015) was a Nigerian politician who was Governor of Bayelsa State in Nigeria from 29 May 1999 to 9 December 2005.

Background
Diepreye Alamieyeseigha was born on 16 November 1952 in Amassoma, Ogboin North Local Government Area, Bayelsa State. He attended the Bishop Dimeari Grammar School, Yenagoa. He joined the Nigerian Defence Academy as a Cadet Officer in 1974, then joined the Nigerian Air Force, where he served in the department of Logistics and Supply. He held various air force positions in Enugu, Makurdi, Kaduna and Ikeja. Alamieyeseigha retired from the air force in 1992 as a Squadron Leader.

After leaving the air force he became the Sole Administrator of Pabod Supplies Port Harcourt. Later he became Head of Budget, Planning, Research and Development of the National Fertiliser Company (NAFCON).

Governor of Bayelsa State

Diepreye Alamieyeseigha was elected as Governor of Bayelsa State in May 1999 as a member of the ruling People's Democratic Party (PDP). He was re-elected in 2003. 
Vice President Atiku Abubakar attended the March 2003 event that kicked of his campaign for reelection in 2003.

Corruption Charges

United Kingdom
Diepreye Alamieyeseigha was detained in London on charges of money laundering in September 2005.
At the time of his arrest, Metropolitan police found about £1m in cash in his London home.
Later they found a total of £1.8m ($3.2m) in cash and bank accounts. 
He was found to own four homes in London worth an alleged £10 million.
His state's monthly federal allocation for the last six years has been in the order of £32 million.
He jumped bail in December 2005 from the United Kingdom by allegedly disguising himself as a woman, though Alamieyeseigha denies this claim.

Alamieyeseigha was impeached on allegations of corruption on 9 December 2005.

Nigeria

On July 26, 2007, Alamieyeseigha pleaded guilty before a Nigerian court to six charges and was sentenced to two years in prison on each charge; however, because the sentences were set to run concurrently and the time was counted from the point of his arrest nearly two years before the sentences, his actual sentence was relatively short. Many of his assets were ordered to be forfeited to the Bayelsa state government. According to Alamieyeseigha, he only pleaded guilty due to his age and would have fought the charges had he been younger. On July 27, just hours after being taken to prison, he was released due to time already served.

In April 2009, Alamieyeseigha pledged a donation of 3,000,000 naira to the Akassa Development Foundation.

In December 2009, the federal government hired a British law firm to help dispose of four expensive properties acquired by Alamieyeseigha in London. Alamieyeseigha had bought one of these properties for £1,750,000.00 in July 2003, paying in cash. Diepreye Solomon Peter Alamieyeseigha used it as his London residence, and as the registered office of 
Solomon and Peters Inc.

United States of America 

On June 28, 2012, the United States (US) Department of Justice (DoJ) announced that it had executed an asset forfeiture order on $401,931 in a Massachusetts brokerage fund, traceable to Alamieyeseigha. US prosecutors filed court papers in April 2011 targeting the Massachusetts brokerage fund and a $600,000 home in Rockville, Maryland, which they alleged were the proceeds of corruption. A motion for default judgement and civil forfeiture was granted by a Massachusetts federal district judge in early June 2012. The forfeiture order was the first to be made under the DoJ's fledgling Kleptocracy Asset Recovery Initiative.

In February 2023, the United States of America signed an agreement with Nigeria for the restitution of approximately one million dollars embezzled by Deprieye Alamieyeseigha..

Pardon

On 12 March 2013, Alamieyeseigha was pardoned by President Goodluck Jonathan, but his pardoning was criticised by many.

Death
Alamieyeseigha was reported to have died of cardiac arrest at the University of Port Harcourt Teaching Hospital on 10 October 2015. However, in a later interview, Bayelsa State Information Commissioner, Esueme Kikile revealed that the former Governor "died of complications arising from high blood pressure and diabetes which affected his kidney."

See also
James Ibori

References

1952 births
2015 deaths
Governors of Bayelsa State
Political scandals
Peoples Democratic Party state governors of Nigeria
Recipients of Nigerian presidential pardons
Nigerian politicians convicted of corruption
People convicted of money laundering
Prisoners and detainees of England and Wales
Nigerian people imprisoned abroad
Nigerian expatriates in the United Kingdom
Corruption in Nigeria
Deaths from kidney failure
Nigerian Air Force officers